Syed Yaˈqūb was a 14th-century Sufi Muslim figure in the Sylhet region. In 1303, he took part in the final battle of the Conquest of Sylhet led by Shah Jalal.

Life
Yaqub Shah was born in Yemen in the 13th century. After meeting with Shah Jalal, he decided to accompany him in his expedition across the Indian subcontinent to propagate the religion of Islam. In 1303, he took part in the final battle of the Conquest of Sylhet under Shah Jalal's leadership against Raja Gour Govinda. Following the victory, Shah Jalal ordered his companions to disperse across Eastern Bengal and surrounding areas. Yaqub migrated to modern-day Horipur in 1341 where he set up a khanqah in the middle of the forest. There are a number of legends associated with the saint. Locals claim that the area was previously inhabited by a blind beast which brought terror to the local people and their cows. The beast was defeated by Yaqub, and this is said to be the reason why Horipur's alternative name is "Kanamara" (meaning "blind-killing" in Sylheti). The people rejoiced at the killing of the beast, and cowherds started to finally farm cows in the area without any fear.

Death and legacy
It is unclear how and what year he died, but he is buried in a Maqam on top of a hill, which is commonly referred to as Kochu Katar Maqam. There are seven graves next to his tomb which are said to be where the cow herders who accompanied the saint are buried. It is a popular local tourist site. At dawn, some people visit as a group of monkeys from the nearby trees can be found at the site.

References

14th-century Yemeni people
Yemeni Sufi saints
Indian people of Yemeni descent
People from Barlekha Upazila
14th-century Indian Muslims
Bengali Sufi saints